Thomas Richard Huening (born January 5, 1942) is an American author, politician, and businessman from San Mateo County, California, in the San Francisco Bay Area.  In his public service role he authored the California's anti-gerrymandering Proposition 119 in June 1990 ballot, co-founded the Garfield Charter School, authored the San Mateo County ballot Measure K extending BART to the San Francisco Airport, and Measure A the Countywide Transportation Expenditure Plan.  An amateur published poet, his latest work The Quintessential Good Samaritan, The Authorized Biography of John Joseph Kelly, Champion of Social Justice (published February, 2022, Post Hill Press), is the personal account of a spiritually progressive Christian focused on restorative justice. His earlier "Spiritual Choices, Putting the HERE in Hereafter" is non-fiction prose dealing with the practice of world religions.

Family 

Huening was born in Chicago, Illinois, the second of twelve children of Clarence Edward Huening and Hermina Ann Huening (née Huberts). With his first wife Kathleen Bernice Hynes he is the father of four daughters, who live in the SF Bay Area, Washington and Texas.

Education 

 Bachelor of Arts degree in 1965 from DePaul University, Chicago, major in Speech, with a minor in Philosophy.
 Bachelor of Laws, La Salle Extension University, Chicago, 1974 passed the California Bar exam.
 MBA, 1982 Pepperdine University.
 passed California's Certified Public Accountant exam in 2003.

Early career experience 

 1965-1970: jet fighter pilot in the US Navy, serving in Vietnam, and flying the F-8 Crusader, UC-45J Navigator, S-2 Tracker (co-pilot), A-7 Corsair, and A-4 Skyhawk.
 1970-1987: commercial pilot for TWA, for which he flew as pilot/flight engineer the Convair 880, Boeing 707, and Boeing 727.
 1970-1976: vice-president, Coldwell Banker Commercial Real Estate in San Jose, Sacramento, and San Francisco, California.

San Mateo County public service 

 elected trustee of San Mateo County Community College District in 1981, serving until 1986.
 elected to the San Mateo County Board of Supervisors, serving 1987 through 1998.
 elected in 1998 as the San Mateo County Controller; reelected in 2002, 2006, and 2010; retired mid-term from public service in 2012.

Other public service 

 in 1992 Huening was the Republican candidate for US Congress in California's 14th District.  As part of his campaign, he organized the Omaha Summit, a post-election gathering of reform-minded freshman Representatives to the US House.  Despite losing to Democrat Anna Eshoo, who still holds this seat, he attended the event held in Omaha, Nebraska, on November 30, 1992.
 co-created and served on Board of Directors of Garfield Charter School (California charter school #49).

Business experience 
 1977 to the present: runs Huening Investment Co., a commercial real estate re-development firm in the Bay Area

Author 
 The Quintessential Good Samaritan, The Authorized Biography of John Joseph Kelly, Champion of Social Justice (publish date February, 2022, Post Hill Press), the personal account of a spiritually progressive Christian.
 Spiritual Choices (published 2006, reissued 2008 as Spiritual Choices: Putting the HERE in Hereafter), a nonfiction work examining what the world's major religions have to offer to the spiritually minded.
 editor of and contributor to "Unicorn: A Contemporary Journal", published by the College of San Mateo.
 regular contributor of political op-ed articles.

References 
 Howard, Leslie. "Lucky Man", San Jose Magazine, October 2007:72-76.
 Castro, Janice. "Not So Fast, Rookies!", Time Magazine, November 9, 1992. Accessed October 31, 2007.
 "Absence of a Quorum", Time Magazine, December 7, 1992. Accessed October 31, 2007.
 "Review & Outlook: Assault on the Gerrymander", Wall Street Journal, December 20, 1989.
 Macdonald, Katharine. "Reapportionment initiative launched", San Francisco Examiner, May 24, 1989.
 United Press International. "Gann Supports Redistricting Initiative", San Francisco Chronicle, May 24, 1989.
 Ingram, Carl. "Reapportionment Plan Calls for Bipartisan Commission", Los Angeles Times, May 24, 1989.
 Studer, Robert P. "Gann, others endorse redistricting proposal", San Diego Union, May 24, 1989.
 Smith, Martin. "San Mateo supervisor seeks end to state gerrymandering", San Francisco Examiner, May 16, 1989.
 Lempert, Sue. "Tom Huening walks away", San Mateo Daily Journal, August 13, 2012. Accessed August 28, 2012.

External links 
 Quintessential Good Samaritan
 Spiritual Choices description and reviews at amazon.com
 Ceremony on March 28, 2012 feting Tom Huening on his retirement from public service, at vimeo.com

Writers from Chicago
DePaul University alumni
Pepperdine University alumni
Living people
1942 births
Commercial aviators